Jingguang Chen is a Chinese-American chemical engineer. He is the Thayer Lindsley Professor of Chemical Engineering at Columbia University, with a joint appointment as Senior Chemist at the U.S. Department of Energy (DOE) Brookhaven National Laboratory. Over the course of his career Chen has made significant contributions to the fundamental understanding and use of novel materials for catalytic and electrocatalytic applications. Central to his research efforts have been the development of bimetallic and transition metal carbide catalysts that eliminate or significantly reduce the loading of expensive precious metals.

Early life and education 
After earning his Bachelors of Science in Chemistry from Nanjing University in 1982, Chen was selected by the China–USA Chemistry Graduate Program (CGP) for graduate studies in the US. He received his Ph.D. in Chemistry at the University of Pittsburgh under the guidance of American surface scientist John Yates. During his Ph.D. studies, he investigated the chemistry and physics of aluminum and aluminum oxide surfaces. Chen then became an Alexander von Humboldt Postdoctoral Fellow at Forschungszentrum-Julich, Germany, where his research under Harald Ibach focused on the chemical and physical properties of surfaces using vibrational spectroscopies.

Professional career 
Upon completion of his postdoctoral position in Germany, Chen went to work for the Exxon Corporate Research Laboratory as a Staff Scientist (1990-1998) and spokesperson for the Exxon U1A Synchrotron Beamline at Brookhaven National Laboratory (1994-1998).  In 1998 he began his academic career at the University of Delaware.  While at Delaware, Chen was named the Claire D. LeClaire Professor of Chemical Engineering (2008) and served several leadership roles including director of the Center for Catalytic Science and Technology (CCST) and director of the University of Delaware Energy Institute (UDEI). In 2012, Chen moved to Columbia University, where he became the Thayer Lindsley Professor of Chemical Engineering. He has also held a joint appointment in the Chemistry Department at DOE's Brookhaven National Lab since 2012.

Throughout his career, Chen has made many pioneering contributions to the understanding and development of novel catalytic and electrocatalytic materials. Of particular interest have been bimetallic catalysts, transition metal carbides, and metal-modified carbide catalysts. Most notably, Chen and his research group have made many key discoveries relating to monolayer (ML) bimetallic catalysts, which are tunable materials where a single atomic layer (i.e. monolayer) of one metal is deposited on the surface or subsurface of a second material. Chen has developed these and other catalytic materials for a wide range of applications, but has been especially interested in developing tunable, low-cost (electro)catalysts for the production and use of clean fuels such as hydrogen (made from water electrolysis), nitrogen-based fuels, and methanol or CO (made from CO2).

Many of Chen's research efforts involve a combination of theory and ultra-high vacuum (UHV) surface science tools to gain fundamental understanding of the chemical, physical, and electronic structures of the catalytic materials he studies.  Chen's research also commonly relies on X-ray synchrotron techniques, such as X-ray Absorption Fine Structure (XAFS) and X-ray absorption Near Edge Spectroscopy (XANES) to better understand the atomic structure of catalytic and electrocatalytic materials. As of 2021, Chen has been an inventor or co-inventor on over 23 patents and published over 475 peer-reviewed papers (h-index=100).

Outside of direct research activities, Chen has also made many contributions to the broader catalysis community. Among these contributions, he has been the co-founder and Director of the Synchrotron Catalysis Consortium (since 2005), Chair of the ACS Catalysis Division (2014-2015), President of the North American Catalysis Society (2017-2025), and associate editor of ACS Catalysis.

Awards 
 Fellow, American Institute of Chemical Engineers, 2021
 Robert H. Wilhelm Award in Chemical Reaction Engineering, American Institute of Chemical Engineers (AIChE), 2020
 R.B. Anderson Award, Canadian Catalysis Division, 2020
 Robert Burwell Lectureship in Catalysis, North American Catalysis Society, 2017
 George Olah Award in Hydrocarbon Chemistry, American Chemical Society, 2015
 Fellow, American Chemical Society, 2013
 Herman Pines Award in Catalysis, Chicago Catalysis Club, 2011
 Excellence in Undergraduate Advising and Mentoring, University of Delaware, 2011
 Excellence in Catalysis Award, New York Catalysis Society, 2008
 Fellow, American Vacuum Society, 2008
 Catalysis Award of Philadelphia Catalysis Club, 2004
 Alexander von Humboldt Fellow (Germany), 1988 – 1989
 Leybold-Heraeus Award (Leybold-Heraeus Corporation), 1987
 Russell and Siguard Varian Fellow (American Vacuum Society), 1986

References 

Year of birth missing (living people)
Living people
Nanjing University alumni
University of Pittsburgh alumni
Fellows of the American Chemical Society
Columbia University faculty
University of Delaware faculty
Chinese chemical engineers
American chemical engineers
Chinese emigrants to the United States